Seekers and Finders is the seventh studio album by Gypsy-punk band Gogol Bordello. It was released in August 2017 under Cooking Vinyl and is their first studio album since 2013's Pura Vida Conspiracy. This is the first Gogol Bordello album produced by frontman Eugene Hütz.

The album's lead single, "Saboteur Blues", was released in June 2017. The album's title track, "Seekers and Finders", features guest singer Regina Spektor.

Track list

References

2017 albums
Cooking Vinyl albums
Gogol Bordello albums